Arthur Bancroft (10 July 1903 – 1984) was an English professional footballer who played as a centre half.

Career
Born in Darlington, Bancroft played for Tow Law Town, Bradford City and Aldershot. For Bradford City, he made 30 appearances in the Football League.

Sources

References

1903 births
1984 deaths
Footballers from Darlington
English footballers
Association football defenders
Tow Law Town F.C. players
Bradford City A.F.C. players
Aldershot F.C. players
English Football League players